L'apache is a 1919 American silent drama film directed by Joe De Grasse and written by Adele Buffington in her first screenplay, John Lynch, and R. Cecil Smith. The film stars Dorothy Dalton, Robert Elliott, Macey Harlam, Austin Webber, George Furry, Frank Cluxon, and Alice Gale. The film was released on November 2, 1919, by Paramount Pictures. It is not known whether the film currently survives.

Cast 
Dorothy Dalton as Natalie 'La Bourget' Bourget / Helen Armstrong
Robert Elliott as Otis Mayne
Macey Harlam as Jean Bourget
Austin Webber as Harrison Forbes
George Furry as Professor Armstrong
Frank Cluxon as Tom Gordon
Alice Gale as Jane
Louis Darclay as The Mouse
Clara Beyers as Zelie

See also
Apaches (subculture)

References

External links 

 

1919 films
1910s English-language films
Silent American drama films
1919 drama films
Paramount Pictures films
Films directed by Joseph De Grasse
American black-and-white films
American silent feature films
1910s American films